The Staatsschauspiel Dresden (State Playhouse Dresden) is a theatre in Dresden. It is maintained by the Free State of Saxony, hence its name. It was created in 1983 and housed in the old  Dresden which traced back to a Royal Court Theatre.

Architectural history

Schauspielhaus
It harmonised with the Zwinger's architecture, with arcades and baroque elements on its exterior. The new theatre's technical facilities, including hydraulically operated machinery for the new sliding scenery by technical director , made it the most advanced theatre of its time.

On 13 and 14 February 1945 the building was partially destroyed in the bombing of Dresden, but was rebuilt and reopened within three years, becoming the first German theatre to reopen post-war.

External links

Homepage 

Buildings and structures in Dresden
Culture in Dresden
Theatres in Germany
Theatres completed in 1913
1913 establishments in Germany